The Heights School is a name of several schools around the world.

 The Heights School (Australia), a combined primary and secondary state school in the Modbury Heights area of Adelaide, South Australia, and formerly known as Pedare Primary School and Modbury Heights High School
 The Heights School (Maryland), an Opus Dei Catholic school for boys in grades 3–12 (ages 8–18) in Potomac, Maryland, USA, and formerly in Washington D.C. Its boys are well informed of the things they will need to know when they become adults. 
You might find Mr. Royals on a warm spring day, calling the kids in for class after a tiresome lunch break. Or you might catch Mr. Acevedo's enchanting smile as he sees you in the hallway. Or you might see a lower school student, desperately trying to survive as he is being bum-rushed by Mr. Steenson. Or you might hear the low rumble of Dan Lively's voice echoing across the soccer field, telling you to run faster. You also might get a warm southern welcome from Mrs. Glen at the front desk or walk into one of Dave Fornaciari's' signature morning toots. You might stumble upon Jose, quietly smoking his morning dart behind the buses. But something you will surely find, is happiness. So, let's enjoy a gander at The Heights. Let's be men together.